Amédée-François Lamy was a French military officer.  He was born at Mougins, in the French département of Alpes-Maritimes on 7 February 1858 and died in the battle of Kousséri on 22 April 1900.

Early years

Lamy's ambition to become an officer developed very early; at ten-years-old, he entered the Prytanée National Militaire, where he won the first prize in Geography in the general concourse of all the department's school, a possible sign of his future colonial career. In 1877 he entered at Saint-Cyr, the foremost French military academy.

Military career

Lamy began his career in 1879 as a Second Lieutenant in the First regiment of Algerian tirailleurs. He discovered Saharan Africa, and took part in the French occupation of Tunisia; he was sent in 1884 to Tonkin, where he remained until 1886. The following year he was back in Algeria, where he became aide-de-camp to the General in command of the division quartered in Algiers in 1887, and resumed his previous interest in the Sahara and learned to exploit the qualities of the meharistes, the camel cavalry. Fascinated by the desert, he learned how to live with little: "Personally, I will be really happy only when I'll be able to live without neither drinking nor eating. At the moment, I'm attempting this kind of existence, but obtaining only a meagre success. I'm still obliged to eat more than six dates at my meals: this is afflicting!".

In 1893 Lamy participated in the Le Châtelier Mission (Middle Congo) where he was in charge of studying the project of a railway between Brazzaville and the coast, and also of making botanical, geological and geographical studies. Through Alfred Le Châtelier, Lamy later met Fernand Foureau,  with whom he assembled the Foureau-Lamy Mission in 1898, charged, with another two expeditions, the Gentil and Voulet-Chanoine missions, to conquer Chad and unify all French dominions in West Africa.

Foureau and Lamy proceeded from Algiers through the Sahara, and met with the other two missions at Kousséri on 21 April 1900. The following day the united French forces confronted Rabih az-Zubayr, a Sudanese warlord who had created an empire in the Chad Basin. In the following battle, in which Lamy was in command with 700 riflemen, while the French reported a crushing victory, Lamy was killed, as was Rabih. In his honour, the first French governor, Émile Gentil, named the capital of the new French territory of Chad Fort-Lamy, which name it bore until it was renamed N'Djamena in 1973.

In 1970, Chad issued an undated gold 1,000 francs coin as part of its tenth independence celebrations. One side features Lamy's head, with a military style collar, and the legend COMMANDANT LAMY 1900.

Bibliography
 Marcel Souzy : Les coloniaux français illustres B. Arnaud Lyon vers 1940
 Gentil, Émile (1971). La chute de l'empire de Rabah. Hachette, 567–577. 
 Ayakanmi Ayandele, Emmanuel (1979). Nigerian Historical Studies. Routledge, 130–131. . 
 Pakenham, Thomas (1992). The Scramble for Africa. Abacus, 515–516. .

See also
Henri Bretonnet Mission
Battle of Togbao 1899
Voulet-Chanoine Mission
Paul Joalland
Émile Gentil
Rabih az-Zubayr
Battle of Kousséri

19th-century French military personnel
People of French West Africa
People of French Equatorial Africa
1858 births
1900 deaths
French military personnel killed in action
People from Alpes-Maritimes